Luna is an unincorporated community in southern Marshall County, Minnesota, United States.

The community lies approximately four miles north of Warren along U.S. Route 75.

Climate

According to the Köppen Climate Classification system, Luna has a warm-summer humid continental climate, abbreviated "Dfb" on climate maps.

Notes

Unincorporated communities in Marshall County, Minnesota
Unincorporated communities in Minnesota